Nafana may refer to:
Nafana people, an ethnic group in Ghana and Ivory Coast
Nafana, Lacs, a town in Lacs District, Ivory Coast
Nafana, Savanes, a town in Savanes District, Ivory Coast
Nafana-Sienso, a village in Denguélé District, Ivory Coast